2010 U-League is the third season for university football teams in South Korea. The number of participating teams has expanded to 67 teams of 72 university football teams in South Korea. Saekyung College of Metropolitan C division has not joined the league, so 66 teams are competing. The league is divided into 6 league divisions, with 11 or 12 teams in each. At the end of the league, the top 32 teams are entered into a knockout playoff.

Participating teams

Metropolitan A Division
 Ajou University
 Chungbuk National University
 Gukje Digital University
 Korea University
 Kwandong University
 Sangji University
 Seoul National University
 Sunmoon University
 Tamna University
 University of Incheon
 Yong-In University
 Yonsei University

Metropolitan B Division
 Cheongju University
 Digital Seoul Culture Arts University
 Hanmin University
 Hanyang University
 Hanzhung University
 Hongik University
 Konkuk University
 Myongji University
 Songho College
 Sungmin University
 University of Suwon

Metropolitan C Division
 Chung-Ang University
 Dankook University
 Dongguk University
 Halla University
 Hoseo University
 Kwangwoon University
 Kyonggi University
 Kyunghee University
 Myungshin University
 Sungkyunkwan University

Central Division
 Andong Science College
 Daegu Arts University
 Hannam University
 Howon University
 Jeonju University
 Kundong University
 Kyungwoon University
 Pai Chai University
 Wonkwang University
 Woosuk University
 Youngdong University

Yeongnam Division
 Daegu University
 Dong-A University
 Dong-eui University
 Gyeongju University
 Inje University
 International University of Korea
 Pukyong National University
 Sorabol College
 Taekyeung College
 University of Ulsan
 Yeungnam University

Honam Division
 Chodang University
 Chosun College of Science and Technology
 Chosun University
 Chunnam Techno College
 Daebul University
 Dongkang College
 Gwangju University
 Hanlyo University
 Honam University
 Kunjang College
 Seonam University

League standing
As of 30 September 2010

Metropolitan A Division

Metropolitan B Division

Metropolitan C Division

Central Division

Yeongnam Division

Honam Division

Sixth place rankings
The best one sixth-placed teams, except Metropolitan A division (6 team advanced) and Metropolitan C division (5 team advanced), also advance to the knockout stage. The final standings are shown below.

Playoff

Bracket
The draw for the playoff was held on 4 October 2010.

Legend

 MA : Metropolitan A Division
 MB : Metropolitan B Division
 MC : Metropolitan C Division
 CT : Central Division
 YN : Yeongnam Division
 HN : Honam Division

 Ground A1 : Artificial turf ground 1
 Ground A2 : Artificial turf ground 2
 Ground A3 : Artificial turf ground 3
 Ground G1 : Grass ground 1
 ''Ground G2 : Grass ground 2

Round of 32

Round of 16

Quarter-finals

Semi-finals

Final

Winner

References

U-League (association football)